The 1959 San Diego State Aztecs football team represented San Diego State College during the 1959 NCAA College Division football season.

San Diego State competed in the California Collegiate Athletic Association (CCAA). The team was led by head coach Paul Governali, in his fourth year, and played home games at Aztec Bowl. They finished the season with one win, six losses and one tie (1–6–1, 0–5–0 CCAA). The Aztecs scored only 74 points in their eight games while giving up 208.

Schedule

Team players in the NFL/AFL
No San Diego State players were selected in the 1960 NFL Draft or 1960 AFL Draft.

The following finished their San Diego State career in 1959, were not drafted, but played in the NFL/AFL.

Notes

References

San Diego State
San Diego State Aztecs football seasons
San Diego State Aztecs football